Zosne matangensis is a species of longhorn beetle in the tribe Saperdini in the genus Zosne that was discovered by Breuning in 1950.

References

Saperdini
Beetles described in 1950